Lecture Notes in Mathematics is a book series in the field of mathematics, including articles related to both research and teaching.  It was established in 1964 and was edited by A. Dold, Heidelberg and B. Eckmann, Zürich. Its publisher is Springer Science+Business Media (formerly Springer-Verlag).

The intent of the series is to publish not only lecture notes, but results from seminars and conferences, more quickly than the several-years-long process of publishing polished journal papers in mathematics. In order to speed the publication process, early volumes of the series (before electronic publishing) were reproduced photographically from typewritten manuscripts. According to Earl Taft it has been "enormously successful" and "is considered a very valuable service to the mathematical community".

 there have been 2232 volumes in this series.

See also
 Lecture Notes in Physics
 Lecture Notes in Computer Science

References

Publications established in 1964
Series of mathematics books
Springer Science+Business Media books